Ama Afo Blay is a Ghanaian educationist. She is a former Director General of the Ghana Education Service. She was appointed into office in 2002 by John Kufuor.

Early life and education 
Blay holds a bachelor's degree in General Education from the University of Cape Coast and a certificate from the Trinity Theological Seminary in Accra. She has also obtained a master's degree in Guidance and Counselling from the Emporia State University in Kansas, United States of America.

Career 
Before she was appointed the Director General of GES on December 11, 2002, she served as the Eastern Regional director of GES.

References

Living people
University of Cape Coast alumni
Trinity Theological Seminary, Legon alumni
Emporia State University alumni
Ghanaian educators
Year of birth missing (living people)